Franco Selleri (Bologna, Italy, 9 October 1936 – 20 November 2013) was an Italian theoretical physicist and professor at the Università degli Studi di Bari Aldo Moro. He received his Doctorate / Ph.D. cum laude at the Università di Bologna in 1958, and was a fellow of the Istituto Nazionale di Fisica Nucleare beginning 1959. He was a member of the New York Academy of Sciences and the Fondation Louis de Broglie, and served on the board of directors of the Italian Physical Society.

He is known for his analysis of the foundations of relativity theory and quantum mechanics. Several solutions have been proposed for the paradoxes pointed out by him. Philosophically, his position was that of a realist. He was in close contact with Karl Popper who, though very old, took part in a conference on the subject that Selleri organized in 1985 in Bari.

He had numerous visiting professorships and fellowships, including CERN, Saclay, University of Nebraska, Cornell University, and Dubna. Also, he was the recipient of a medal from Gdanskie Towarzystwo Naukowe (Poland). During his scientific career, he published more than 200 papers in particle physics, quantum theory, relativity and history and philosophy of physics. He was the author of numerous books and editor of numerous conference proceedings on topics relating to the foundations of physics.

Books
2009	Weak Relativity: The Physics of Space and Time Without Paradoxes
2007	Controlled Nucleosynthesis: Breakthroughs in Experiment and Theory, 
2003	Lezioni di relativita - da Einstein all etere di Lorentz, 
2002	La Natura del Tempo: Propagazioni super-luminali, paradosso dei gemelli, teletrasporto (The Nature of Time), 
1998	Einstein, Podolsky, and Rosen Paradox in Atomic, Nuclear, and Particle Physics, 
1998	Open Questions in Relativistic Physics, 
1995	Advances in Fundamental Physics, 
1993	Fundamental Questions in Quantum Physics and Relativity: Collected Papers in Honor of Louis de Broglie , 
1992	Wave-Particle Duality, 
1990	Quantum Paradoxes and Physical Reality co-authored with Alwy van der Merwe, 
1989	Fisica Senza Dogma (Physics without Dogma), 
1988	Quantum Mechanics versus Local Realism: The Einstein-Podolsky-Rosen Paradox (Physics of Atoms and Molecules), 
1983/1990	Die Debatte um die Quantentheorie (The Debate on Quantum Theory)

References

External links

Telesio - Galilei Academy of Science Board

20th-century Italian physicists
Theoretical physicists
1936 births
2013 deaths
Scientists from Bologna
University of Bologna alumni
People associated with CERN
21st-century Italian physicists
Cornell University faculty